Herlene Nicole Policarpio Budol (born August 23, 1999), also known as "Hipon Girl", is a Filipino comedienne, model, actress, beauty pageant titleholder, and vlogger. She was a co-host of the Philippine variety game show Wowowin. Budol gained popularity when she joined the Wowowin segment "Willie of Fortune". Willie Revillame decided to make her a regular co-host of his show because of her talent and funny jokes.

Career

Acting career 
Budol appeared in Magpakailanman on November 30, 2019, and played the role of Jenny, an OFW, in the episode "Yaya Dubai & I". That was her first television drama project in GMA Network which trended and gained higher ratings than an episode of ABS-CBN's MMK, their rival network. She also appeared in the TV series Madrasta, playing the role of 'Sandy Escudero'. She was the title holder of "Binibining Angono in Sining" in 2017. She also appeared and participated in the Philippine comedy TV series One of the Baes.

Pageantry 
She joined Binibining Pilipinas 2022 as a contender, bagging seven special awards and ending up as 1st runner-up. She is the Philippines' representative for Miss Planet International 2022, but withdrew.

Filmography

Television

Web series

References

External links 
 
 

1999 births
Living people
People from Rizal
Filipino women comedians
GMA Network personalities
Filipino women television presenters
Filipino television personalities
Filipino television variety show hosts
21st-century Filipino actresses
Filipino television actresses
Binibining Pilipinas winners